"Hasta los Dientes" is a song recorded by Cuban-American singer Camila Cabello, featuring vocals from Argentine singer María Becerra. It was released through Epic Records as the fourth and final single from Cabello's third studio album, Familia.

The song, which focuses on an all-consuming, obsessive love, has been dubbed as a reggaeton-disco song. It has also been said to resemble Dua Lipa's nu-disco sound.

Music video
An accompanying "space-themed" music video was released on May 13, 2022, and it was directed by Charlotte Rutherford. The clip finds Cabello and Becerra in colorful outfits and wigs, filming a performance of the song on set aboard a spaceship. The duo trade verses, delving into groovy choreography with their space disco-dressed dancers. The video ends with a live audience and a TV crew applaud as Cabello and Becerra take a bow and walk hand-in-hand off the set.

Charts

References

2022 singles
2022 songs
Camila Cabello songs
María Becerra songs
Songs written by Camila Cabello
Epic Records singles
Syco Music singles
Songs written by Ricky Reed
Songs written by Edgar Barrera